André Luiz de Carvalho Ribeiro (born August 27, 1989) is a Brazilian physician and politician. He was State Deputy (2011–2015). Fufuca is Federal Deputy and President of Progressistas in Maranhão.

Political career
Fufuca voted in favor of the impeachment of then-president Dilma Rousseff. Fufuca voted against the 2017 Brazilian labor reform, and would vote against a corruption investigation into Rousseff's successor Michel Temer.

References 

Brazilian Social Democracy Party politicians
Patriota politicians
Progressistas politicians
Living people
1989 births
Brazilian physicians
People from Maranhão
Members of the Chamber of Deputies (Brazil) from Maranhão
Members of the Legislative Assembly of Maranhão